Azzurra is a 12-metre class yacht that competed in the 1983 Louis Vuitton Cup.

See also
 Italy at the America's Cup

References

12-metre class yachts
Sailing yachts of Italy
Louis Vuitton Cup yachts